An Établissement d'hébergement pour personnes âgées dépendantes (also called EHPAD) is the most widespread type of French Residential care for senior citizens.

History 
After World War II, residential care for senior citizens were called hospice. A French law of 3 June 1975, changed the designation for Maison de retraite (Retirement home), partly because the old terminology had become derogatory. Another reform in 1999 created the new Établissement d’hébergement pour personnes âgées dépendantes (EHPAD) terminology.

Operation 
EHPADs can be public or privately owned. In 2017, from a total of 7000 in France, 40% were public, 30% belonged to non-commercial organizations  and 30% to the private sector.

The largest private groups managing EHPAD in France in 2020 were:
 Korian with approximately 25,000 beds
 Orpea with approximately 20,000 beds
 DomusVi with approximately 17,000 beds

Residents 
The level of dependency of seniors in EHPADs is high: in 2011, more than 40% of residents had Alzheimer's disease, and three quarters had a Cardiovascular disease.

Dependency levels 
A normalized scale determines the level of dependency of a resident. This scale called GIR (groupe iso-ressources) has the following values:
 GIR 1 : Total mental and physical dependency
 GIR 2 : High mental and physical dependency
 GIR 3 : Physical dependency
 GIR 4 : Partial physical dependency
 GIR 5 : Moderate dependency
 GIR 6 : No dependency

Costs
The cost for the family of a resident can be high. According to a 2010 KPMG study, the mean cost for one day for an EHPAD place is 49 € for accommodation, and 24 € for care.

References

Caregiving
Geriatrics
Housing